Pat Thomas (born Nana Kwabena Amo Mensah; August 14, 1946) is a Ghanaian vocalist and songwriter. He is widely known for his work in highlife bands of Ebo Taylor.

Early life and education 
Pat Thomas was born in Agona in the Ashanti region of Ghana. His father was a music theory instructor and his mother a bandleader.

Career 
He started his musical career in the 1960s where he collaborated with Ebo Taylor. In 1974,  he formed the band "Sweet Beans" and with them, he recorded his first album False lover. He recorded his second album "Pat Thomas Introduces Marijata" with the band Marijata. After the coup in Ghana in 1979, he relocated to Berlin and later settled in Canada. He is now touring worldwide with his Kwashibu Area Band. In June 2015 they released the album Pat Thomas and Kwashibu Area Band to mark 50 years of his musical career. Thomas is known as “The Golden Voice Of Africa”.

Awards 
In the year 2015, Pat Thomas and Kwashibu Area Band self-titled album was listed by AllMusic as one of the "Favorite Latin and World Albums".

Albums 
2015 - Pat Thomas & Kwashibu Area Band - Pat Thomas & Kwashibu Area Band (CD / 12") K7 Music  
2016 - Pat Thomas - Coming home (CD) K7 Music
2019 - Pat Thomas & Kwashibu area band - Obiaa! (CD / 12") K7 Music
2019 - Pat Thomas & Kwashibu Are Band - Yamona (Dam Swindle remix) (CD) K7 Music

References

External links 
 
 
 
 

Living people
Ghanaian highlife musicians
20th-century Ghanaian male singers
1946 births
21st-century Ghanaian male singers
21st-century Ghanaian singers